William Byron Lee (born October 9, 1959) is an American businessman, cattle farmer, former mechanical engineer, and politician who has served as the 50th governor of Tennessee since 2019. A member of the Republican Party, Lee defeated Democratic nominee Karl Dean in 2018, and was reelected over Democratic nominee Jason Martin in 2022. Before entering politics, he held various positions at the Lee Company, a business operated by his family; he was its president and chief executive officer from 1992 to 2016.

Lee's official biography says he is focused as governor on education, economic development, and public safety. In his first budget proposal, Lee outlined plans for K-12 education, mental health, criminal justice, rural economic development, and health care. Lee's early executive orders included an order requiring all state executive departments to report rural impact and recommendations for improvement and three regarding ethics and transparency.

Lee identifies as a social conservative. He signed bills that ban abortion in Tennessee, mask mandates, and ranked-choice voting, allow permitless carry, create a school voucher program, and increase penalties for protest-related offenses. Lee signed Tennessee's "bathroom bill," a bill that continues taxpayer funding of adoption agencies that exclude LGBT people, and Tennessee Senate Bill 3, which bans public drag performances.

Early life and career
William Byron Lee was born on October 9, 1959. He was raised on his family's  cattle farm started by his grandparents in Franklin, Tennessee, the Triple L Ranch; the family raises Hereford cattle. Lee is a seventh-generation Tennessean.

After graduating from Franklin High School in his hometown, Lee entered Auburn University in 1977 and graduated in 1981 with a bachelor's degree in mechanical engineering. In college, Lee was a member of the Kappa Alpha Order, a fraternity known at the time for its use of Confederate imagery, and a photo printed in the university's 1980 yearbook shows Lee in a Confederate military uniform at the fraternity's "Old South" party. In 2019, after his attendance came to light, Lee expressed regret for his participation: "I never intentionally acted in an insensitive way, but with the benefit of hindsight, I can see that participating in that was insensitive and I've come to regret it."

Lee was named president and CEO of his family's home services and construction company, Lee Company, holding the position from 1992 until 2016. He briefly served as chairman.

Personal life
Lee lives in Fernvale with his second wife, Maria, whom he married in October 2008. His first wife, Carol Ann, died in 2000 in a horseback riding accident. After her death, Lee took extended time off from his construction company to raise his four children.

Lee attends Grace Chapel Church in Leiper's Fork.

Lee previously served as a member of the board of trustees of Belmont University, chairman of the YMCA of Middle Tennessee, president of the Associated Builders and Contractors, and a board member of the Hope Clinic for Women and the Men of Valor Prison Ministry.

Gubernatorial elections

2018

In April 2017, Lee announced his candidacy in the 2018 election for governor of Tennessee. A self-described social conservative, he also targeted pro-business Republicans. In the Republican primary election, Lee faced Congresswoman Diane Black, Knoxville businessman and former Tennessee Economic and Development Commissioner Randy Boyd, and state House speaker Beth Harwell. Originally considered a long shot, Lee rose in the polls as Boyd and Black launched negative advertising against each other. He won the August 2 primary with 291,414 votes (36.8%) to Boyd's 193,054 (24.3%), Black's 182,457 (23.0%), and Harwell's 121,484 (15.3%).

Lee defeated former Democratic Nashville mayor Karl Dean in the November 6 general election, receiving 1,336,106 votes (59.6%) to Dean's 864,863 (38.6%).

This marked the first time since 1982 that a candidate from the incumbent U.S. President's party was elected governor of Tennessee. This is also the first time that Republicans won three consecutive gubernatorial elections in the state, and the first time that a Republican was elected to succeed another Republican.

This large surge in candidates was mostly due to the Libertarian Party of Tennessee's protest of the state's party affiliation and ballot access laws.

2022

In September 2020, Lee announced his candidacy for reelection for 2022. He was unchallenged in the Republican primary and endorsed in August 2021 by Donald Trump.

In the November 8 general election, Lee was reelected, receiving 1,129,390 votes (64.9%) to Democratic nominee Jason Martin's 572,818 (32.9%).

During the general election, Lee flipped reliably Democratic Haywood County, home to Brownsville. It is one of only two remaining counties in Tennessee, along with Shelby County, with a majority African-American population. Haywood County has not voted Republican on a presidential level since 1972.

Voter turnout for the 2022 midterm elections in Tennessee was the lowest it has been in nearly a decade, with only 38.57% of Tennessee's registered voters turning out. The last time turnout was this low in Tennessee was in the 2014 midterm elections. This turnout was far below the 2020 presidential election in Tennessee, which saw a turnout of 68.6%.

Lee was sworn in on January 21, 2023.

Tenure as governor

Lee was sworn in on January 19, 2019, and delivered his first State of the State address to the Tennessee General Assembly in March 2019.

Abortion 
In January 2020, Lee proposed a bill to ban abortion as early as six weeks into pregnancy. The legislation was among the nation's strictest abortion bans, and was similar to six-week abortion bans that were blocked by courts in Mississippi, Ohio, and other states. Passed in the final hours of the General Assembly 2020 session on a party-line vote, it was challenged in federal court by Planned Parenthood and the ACLU. Lee signed the bill into law in July 2020. A federal judge immediately blocked its enforcement because it violated Supreme Court precedent, such as Roe v. Wade, which prohibits undue burdens on pre-viability abortions.

After Roe v. Wade was overturned, Lee supported Tennessee's near-total ban on abortion, which provides no exception for rape, incest, or the mother's health, except in cases of serious bodily harm to the mother.

Health care and leave
Lee opposes the expansion of TennCare, the state's Medicaid program, as allowed by the Patient Protection and Affordable Care Act. As governor, he has rejected proposals to expand TennCare. Lee has supported calls from dentists to extend TennCare to pregnant women who need dental care.

In January 2020, Lee signed an executive order effective March 1, 2020, that offered state employees three months' paid leave for new parents and caregivers of sick relatives. He called it "one of the most cost-effective investments in the families of our state employees in recent history".

Budget and economy
In 2019, Lee proposed repealing Tennessee's 10% amusement tax on gym, fitness center, and health club fees, arguing that the tax discourages Tennesseans from being physically active. If enacted, the repeal would reduce state revenues by around $10 million.

In September 2020, Lee supported a Tennessee delegation that traveled to Beijing to enhance trade and economic linkages between the state and the People's Republic of China.

Education
In a March 2019 "State of West Tennessee" address, Lee proposed creating more charter schools and that the state use $25 million to help traditional public schools when they lose students. In his February 2020 "state of West Tennessee" address, he proposed investing $70 million to equip teachers with professional development, materials, and other tools to help increase the state's literacy rate. Lee has also promoted the GIVE program, which prioritizes learning opportunities in rural counties and enhances career and technical education statewide.

In April 2019, Lee announced that Tennessee would temporarily reinstate paper-based assessments for students taking the TNReady test, an annual statewide assessment, during the 2019–20 school year.

Lee supports charter schools. In May 2019, he signed into law a school voucher bill that created a program to provide public funds to families for private school tuition and costs, starting in the 2020–21 fiscal year, but a judge ruled the program unconstitutional in May 2020, before it could go into effect. Of $64 million in discretionary COVID-19 relief funding for education that went to his office, Lee sent $10 million to charter schools, including $4.4 million to launch new charters.

In July 2019, Lee signed a bill into law that calls for school districts across the state to establish threat assessment teams to address potential threats to school safety.

In February 2020, Lee proposed a $117 million investment to increase teacher salaries and a $250 million endowment to address mental health in K-12 education.

Race relations and Floyd protests
In July 2019, Lee signed an order proclaiming Nathan Bedford Forrest Day, as required by Tennessee law, celebrating Forrest, a famous confederate general and the first Grand Wizard of the white supremacist group the Ku Klux Klan. The legislature repealed this requirement in June 2020. In December 2019, Lee proclaimed December 1 Rosa Parks Day, to commemorate the start of the 1955 Montgomery bus boycott.

In May 2020, after Minneapolis police murdered George Floyd, Lee condemned the officers involved, saying, "police brutality is not law enforcement". On May 30, 2020, an "I will breathe" protest was held in Nashville in protest of Floyd's murder. During the protest, a man set fire to the Davidson County Courthouse; the building was not severely damaged. In response, Lee mobilized the National Guard in Nashville, saying the protests had taken "a violent, unlawful turn".

In August 2020, Lee signed into law a bill increasing the severity of penalties for a number of protest-related offenses. One notable change is that it reclassifies camping on state property, after being warned of trespass, from a misdemeanor to a felony offense punishable by up to six years in prison. This means that anyone convicted of the act will also lose their right to vote, as convicted felons in Tennessee are disfranchised.

Refugee resettlement
In December 2019, after the Donald Trump administration allowed states to halt refugee resettlement in their states, Lee declined the offer (making Tennessee one of a handful of Republican-led states to do so) and announced that Tennessee would continue to accept refugees. Lee's decision was opposed by Lieutenant Governor Randy McNally and Speaker of the Tennessee House of Representatives Cameron Sexton. During a 2020 trip to the Tri-Cities, Lee was met with protests from opponents of refugee resettlement.

Capital punishment
Lee supports capital punishment, and Tennessee has executed seven people since resuming executions in 2018.

One notable person executed under Lee is Nicholas Todd Sutton. He was sentenced to life after taking 3 lives from 1979 to 1980. While in prison, he saved one corrections officer's life, protected two others, and converted to Christianity. In 1986, Sutton took the life of another prisoner after he threatened to kill Sutton, who was then sentenced to death. In February 2020, he was executed after Lee denied clemency.

Guns
In 2019, with the support of Republican state legislators, Lee loosened Tennessee's handgun law, allowing "concealed-carry-only" handgun permits to be obtained without requiring applicants to show an ability to fire a weapon. In April 2021, Lee signed into law a "permitless carry" bill; the legislation allows most adults 21 and older (as well as military personnel ages 18–20) to carry handguns (open and concealed) without a background check or required training. It also increased the penalty for unlawful use of a firearm and obtaining an illegal firearm. The bill, which Lee also supported the previous year, was supported by the National Rifle Association and opposed by law enforcement organizations, such as police chiefs, sheriffs and prosecutors.

2020 presidential election
After Supreme Court Justice Ruth Bader Ginsburg died on September 18, 2020, several weeks before the presidential election, Lee supported Trump's nomination of Amy Coney Barrett to fill the vacant seat, citing his position on abortion.

After Joe Biden defeated Trump in the 2020 presidential election, Lee was one of many Republican officials nationwide and in Tennessee who refused to acknowledge Biden's victory amid Trump's false claims of fraud. Biden won a clear victory in both the popular and the electoral vote, but Lee refused to recognize Biden as president-elect even after the election had been called, after the presidential transition had formally begun, and after the electoral college had voted, formalizing Biden's victory.

On January 8, 2021, two days after a pro-Trump mob stormed the U.S. Capitol in a bid to disrupt the counting of the electoral votes and keep Trump in power, Lee condemned the riot and acknowledged Biden as president-elect.

Social issues
Lee identifies as a social conservative. He emphasized his Christian faith, creating an office devoted to "faith-based" initiatives, and declared October 10 an official voluntary day of prayer and fasting.

LGBT issues 
Lee supports allowing religious foster care and adoption agencies to prohibit same-sex married couples from adopting children. In January 2020, he signed into law a bill that assures continued taxpayer funding of faith-based foster care and adoption agencies even if they exclude LGBT families and others based on religious beliefs. Lee and supporters of the legislation framed the bill as a "religious liberty" bill that would shield organizations from potential lawsuits hostile to the group's religious beliefs. Nike and Amazon opposed the bill.

On March 26, Lee signed legislation banning transgender athletes from participating in sports opposite to their biological sex, making Tennessee the third state to do so. In May 2020, he signed a controversial "bathroom bill" that prohibited transgender people from accessing public school bathrooms that correspond to their gender identity. Critics have condemned these bills as discriminatory toward transgender people, as well as LGBTQ people in general.

In May 2021, Lee signed legislation that forces businesses who serve transgender customers equally with restrooms to display warning signs that they do so. LGBT activists, Democrats, and some Republicans, criticized the bill as an attempt to shame and harm businesses. Many businesses and business leaders threatened to leave Tennessee in protest of these bills, including Nissan North America, Amazon, Dell, Pilot, Mars PetCare, and Warner Music Group, and Republican transgender business leader Jennifer Pritzker. The American Civil Liberties Union sued to stop the law, In July 2021, a federal judge granted a preliminary injunction blocking enforcement of the law, finding that it violated the First Amendment.

On February 27, 2023, Lee declared that he would sign Tennessee Senate Bill 3, which bans public drag performances; the first violation of the law would be a misdemeanor, while the second would be a felony. Lee's announcement came two days after photos of him dressed in drag went viral on social media platform Reddit. The 1977 high school yearbook photo shows Lee dressed as a female cheerleader, wearing a wig and pearl necklace. Lee signed the anti-drag bill into law on March 2, 2023.

Marijuana and gambling 
As a candidate for governor, Lee opposed medical marijuana legislation and marijuana decriminalization. As governor, he continued to oppose marijuana decriminalization, saying in 2019, "I have said before and still believe that we should not decriminalize marijuana... I think that's not good for our state."

An opponent of legalized gambling in the state, in 2019 Lee allowed a sports betting legalization bill to become law without his signature.

COVID-19 pandemic

On March 12, 2020, in response to the growing number of COVID-19 cases, Lee issued an executive order declaring a temporary state of emergency in Tennessee to "facilitate the treatment and containment of COVID-19." He extended the "stay-at-home" mandate through April 2020. Lee issued further orders for a "limited continuing state of emergency" through 2020 and 2021 to facilitate the state's eligibility for federal economic aid, and allowed the Tennessee National Guard and Tennessee State Guard to continue to assist with COVID-19 response efforts.

In March 2020, as the number of COVID-19 cases grew, Lee urged school districts to close through March to prevent the further spread of the disease. In April, as the number of COVID-19 cases continued to grow, he asked all school districts to close for the remainder of the school year. In October 2020, after a member of Lee's security detail tested positive for COVID-19, Lee said that he and his wife would quarantine at home, likely for two weeks.

Throughout the pandemic, Lee opposed a statewide mask mandate and "touted Tennessee for being one of the last to close early in the pandemic and among the first to reopen." On April 28, 2020, Lee signed an executive order allowing gyms in 89 out of 95 counties to open on May 1. By September, he lifted restrictions on businesses and gathering restrictions in Tennessee, except for the state's six most populous counties. By April 2021, Lee declared that COVID-19 was "a managed public health issue in Tennessee and no longer a statewide public health emergency"; ended local authority on mask mandates in 89 counties; and called for remaining local restrictions to be lifted.

As the highly contagious Delta variant spread in Tennessee, Lee said that he had "no real concern" over it. COVID-19 cases and hospitalizations surged in Tennessee from July to August 2021. Tennessee's COVID-19 vaccination rate was among the lowest in the country. Lee encouraged Tennesseans to get vaccinated, but opposed vaccine mandates and, amid the resurgence of COVID-19 cases, maintained that it was a personal choice whether to get vaccinated. He also dismissed suggestions for a return to restrictions or offering COVID-19 vaccine incentives.

In 2021, Lee blocked the Tennessee Department of Health from reaching out to teenagers to encourage them to get the vaccinated. In July 2021, his administration fired the state's vaccine chief, Michelle Fiscus, who had angered some Republican state legislators by promoting vaccination for eligible youth. The state Health Department stopped vaccination-related outreach to minors for all diseases, not only COVID-19. Lee opposed offering vaccine incentives even as the Tennessee government spent nearly $500,000 to incentivize farmers to vaccinate cattle against respiratory disease as part of the "Herd Health" program, launched in 2019 under Lee.

In August 2021, Lee signed an executive order that allowed parents to let their children opt out of school mask mandates. The next month, Lee vowed to fight President Joe Biden's plan to require COVID-19 vaccines for federal employees and federal contractors, as well as to require businesses with more than 100 employees to require vaccination or weekly COVID-19 testing; Lee asserted that the action was unconstitutional.

In November 2021, Lee signed a bill into law that restricted the ability of localities to implement public health restrictions, such as mask mandates.

Other
  

In February 2020, Lee signed a bill making Tennessee's official nickname the "Volunteer State." The name originated during the War of 1812, when Tennessee sent 1,500 volunteer soldiers.

In 2021, Lee appointed John DeBerry as his senior advisor. DeBerry was a Democratic member of the state house whom the Tennessee Democratic Party removed from the 2020 primary ballot.

In July 2019, Lee toured damage in West Tennessee inflicted by flooding from the remnants of Hurricane Barry. A series of tornadoes in Tennessee on March 2–3, 2020 killed 25 people and injured 150. Lee oversaw the state's recovery efforts and surveyed the damage in Nashville, visiting Germantown, Tennessee State University, and Cookeville.

In 2022, Lee signed a bill into law that prohibits localities in Tennessee from using ranked-choice voting.

Electoral history

2018 election

*This election had 28 candidates total.

2022 election

References

External links

Official governor website
Campaign website

|-

|-

|-

|-

1959 births
American construction businesspeople
Auburn University alumni
Businesspeople from Tennessee
Republican Party governors of Tennessee
Living people
People from Franklin, Tennessee
21st-century American politicians
Engineers from Tennessee